The Stephen F. Austin Lumberjacks and Ladyjacks are composed of 16 teams representing Stephen F. Austin State University (SFA) in intercollegiate athletics.  Stephen F. Austin teams participate in the Division I as a member of the Western Athletic Conference (WAC), having joined that conference on July 1, 2021, leaving the Southland Conference.  The football team competes in the NCAA Division I (Football Championship Subdivision (FCS,-formerly known as Division I-AA) for football).

On July 1, 2021, SFA was one of five institutions announced as future members of the Western Athletic Conference (WAC), alongside three other Southland members from Texas (Abilene Christian, Lamar, Sam Houston) plus Big Sky Conference member Southern Utah. Initially, all five schools were to join in July 2022, but the entry of SFA and the other Texas schools was moved to 2021 after the Southland expelled its departing members. Because the WAC does not sponsor beach volleyball, SFA joined the ASUN Conference for that sport. After the 2022 season, SFA moved beach volleyball to the Sun Belt Conference.

Sports sponsored

Bowling 
The Stephen F. Austin Ladyjacks bowling team won the 2016 NCAA national championship, going to a deciding seventh game in defeating defending national champion Nebraska. The Ladyjacks added their second national title in five seasons in 2019, defeating Vanderbilt by a 4–1 score.

Softball 

The Ladyjacks softball team has appeared in four Women's College World Series in 1978, 1983, 1985,1986.

National Championships

Team (3)
Softball: 1986
Bowling: 2016
Bowling: 2019

Individual (5)
Steve Riza (Men's Tennis - Singles): 1984
Tom Goles & Chris Langford (Men's Tennis - Doubles): 1985
Neil Smith (Men's Tennis - Singles): 1986
Demi Payne (Women's Pole Vault): 2015
 Branson Ellis (Men's Pole Vault): 2021

References

External links
 
NCAAsports.com
List of NCAA champions